Bastilla dicoela is a moth of the family Noctuidae first described by Alfred Jefferis Turner in 1909. It is found in the Australian state of Queensland.

References

External links

Bastilla (moth)
Moths described in 1909